Cat Tales Wildlife Center formerly Cat Tales Zoological Park is a USDA Licensed - Class C - Exhibitor (all zoos fall under this classification) that helps rescue and protect big cats and Northwest wildlife. It is located in Mead, Washington. As the need for forever homes constantly changes 2020 increased the sanctuary count to twenty one various felines, including bobcat, lynx, puma, lion, Siberian tiger, Bengal tiger, and white tiger. Along with two black bears, and twelve various canines, including arctic fox, red fox, coyote, and wolfdog.

Cat Tales was founded in 1990 by Mike and Debbie Wyche and incorporated on July 27, 1991, as a 501(c)3 non-profit charity. Cat Tales Wildlife Academy is the sanctuary's vocational and zoological technology school, licensed by the Workforce Training and Education Board. Cat Tales is the only zoo in Spokane County.  They are home to many animals that have troubled pasts and have been rescued from difficult situations or private owners, often placed at Cat Tales as a final home and safe sanctuary.  Through outreach to the community via fairs, expos, classroom visits and otherwise, it is one of Cat Tales primary stated goals that they wish to educate the public about wildlife close to home and far away; their plights and need for support in the wild.

As of September 2019, one of Cat Tales original founders, Mike Wyche died after a long illness.  As of his passing the park is run by his wife and head teacher of the zoological education center, Deborah Wyche, as well as his daughter, Lisa Wyche.

Notes

External links

 http://www.zooschool.org/

Parks in Spokane County, Washington
Zoos in Washington (state)
Charities based in Washington (state)
Non-profit organizations based in Spokane, Washington
Organizations established in 1991
Tourist attractions in Spokane, Washington
Buildings and structures in Spokane, Washington
Zoos established in 1991
1991 establishments in Washington (state)